Matt's BBQ is a barbecue restaurant in Portland, Oregon's Boise neighborhood. Sibling restaurant Matt's BBQ Tacos, also located in Portland, opened in 2019.

History
In 2015, Matt Vicedomini opened his first food cart on Northeast Martin Luther King Jr. Boulevard.

Matt's BBQ Tacos opened the 2019. The sibling restaurant offers breakfast tacos.

Both restaurants closed temporarily in March 2020, during the COVID-19 pandemic. Limited operations were restored in April.

In 2021, Matt's BBQ confirmed plans to expand into Beaverton, Oregon. Matt's BBQ Tacos was featured on the Netflix series Street Food in 2022. Matt's BBQ Tacos, which initially operated as a food cart, relocated to  Northeast Alberta Street and began operating as a brick and mortar restaurant in November 2022.

Reception
In 2017, Martin Cizmar of Willamette Week wrote, "Fact: Matt's BBQ Has the Best Brisket and Ribs in Portland".

Matt's BBQ Tacos was named The Oregonian 2019 Cart of the Year.

See also

 List of barbecue restaurants
 List of Diners, Drive-Ins and Dives episodes

References

External links

 
 Matt's BBQ Tacos
 Matt's BBQ at the Food Network

2015 establishments in Oregon
Barbecue restaurants in Oregon
Boise, Portland, Oregon
Food carts in Portland, Oregon
North Portland, Oregon
Restaurants established in 2015
Restaurants in Beaverton, Oregon
Restaurants in Portland, Oregon